Taxation as slavery is the idea that taxation results in an unfree society in which individuals are forced to work to enrich the government and the recipients of largesse, rather than for their own benefit.

History 
Historically, the earliest and most widespread form of taxation was the corvee, which can be traced back to the beginning of civilization. The corvee was state-imposed forced labor on peasants too poor to pay other forms of taxation (labor in ancient Egyptian is a synonym for taxes).

In her book, American Patriots, journalist Gail Buckley wrote, "In British eyes, the American colonies existed only for the benefit of the mother country, but Americans saw any form of taxation as slavery." Anarcho-capitalists and other right-libertarians are some of the foremost proponents of the argument that taxation is equivalent to slavery. The International Society for Individual Liberty has made this claim, as has Bureaucrash, which refers to Social Security as "social slavery."

George Mason University professor Thomas Rustici uses two hypothetical anecdotes to illustrate his point of view:

Leo Tolstoy argued that taxation of labor is one of three stages of slavery (the other two being land slavery and personal slavery).

See also

References 

Anarcho-capitalism
Libertarian terms
Slavery
Libertarian theory